The male name Vasile is of Greek origin and means "King". Vasile is a male Romanian given name or a surname. It is equivalent to the English name Basil. It is also used by the Megleno-Romanians.

As a given name

As a surname

Cristian Vasile (1908–1985), Romanian tango-romance singer
Nicolae Vasile (born 1995), Romanian professional footballer
Niculina Vasile (born 1958), former Romanian high jumper
Radu Vasile (1942–2013), Romanian politician and Prime Minister
Ștefan Vasile (born 1982), Romanian Olympic canoer

Places

Pârâul lui Vasile, a river in Romania
Valea lui Vasile, a river in Romania
 Vasile Aron (Sibiu district)

See also 
 Vasiliu (surname)
 Vasilescu (surname)
 Vasilievca (disambiguation)
 Vasile Alecsandri (disambiguation)
 Vasileuți, name of two villages in Moldova and Ukraine

Megleno-Romanian masculine given names
Romanian masculine given names
Surnames
Romanian-language surnames